Annals of Cardiac Anaesthesia is a quarterly peer-reviewed open-access medical journal published by Medknow Publications on behalf of the Indian Association of Cardiovascular Thoracic Anaesthesiologists. It covers anaesthesia as related to cardiology and was established in 1998. The editor-in-chief is Prabhat Tewari (Sanjay Gandhi Postgraduate Institute of Medical Sciences), who succeeded Poonam Malhotra Kapoor (All India Institute of Medical Sciences, Delhi) in 2018. Kapoor caused controversy when she published an editorial touting the accomplishments of the journal. Although Kapoor published a correction, her successor accused her of having "glorified" her contributions, "undermining the efforts of the past editors" of the journal, and the editorial was subsequently retracted.

Abstracting and indexing 
The journal is abstracted and indexed in:
EBSCO databases
Emerging Sources Citation Index
Excerpta Medica/Embase
Index Medicus/MEDLINE/PubMed
Scopus

References

External links

Cardiology journals
English-language journals
Medknow Publications academic journals
Open access journals
Publications established in 1998
Quarterly journals